Thomas Bryden (1 June 1877 – 12 October 1917) was a New Zealand cricketer. He played two first-class matches for Otago between 1912 and 1914. He was killed in action during World War I at the First Battle of Passchendaele. Bryden had worked as a chair maker before the war.

See also
 List of cricketers who were killed during military service

References

External links
 

1877 births
1917 deaths
New Zealand cricketers
Otago cricketers
Cricketers from Invercargill
New Zealand military personnel killed in World War I
New Zealand Army soldiers
New Zealand Military Forces personnel of World War I